Yuri Nikitin may refer to:

 Yuri Nikitin (author) (born 1939), Russian sci-fi author
 Yuri Nikitin (gymnast) (born 1978), Ukrainian trampolinist